Russell Louder is a Canadian musician and performance artist from Prince Edward Island, whose album Humor was longlisted for the 2021 Polaris Music Prize.

Louder, who is non-binary, released the EP Think of Light in 2017, and followed up with a number of singles before Humor was released in February 2021.

They are currently based in Montreal, Quebec. Their older brother, Leon Louder, is also a musician.

References

21st-century Canadian singers
Canadian indie pop musicians
Canadian performance artists
Canadian LGBT singers
Non-binary musicians
Musicians from Prince Edward Island
Musicians from Montreal
Living people
Year of birth missing (living people)
21st-century Canadian LGBT people